By the Light of the Moon may refer to:

By the Light of the Moon (novel), 2002 novel by Dean Koontz
By the Light of the Moon (album), 1987 album by Los Lobos
By the Light of the Moon (film), 1911 film by Edwin S. Porter
 "By the Light of the Moon" (The Vampire Diaries), an episode of the TV series The Vampire Diaries
"Au clair de la lune" ("By the Light of the Moon"), a French folk song of the 18th century
Au clair de la lune (film), a 1983 Canadian film directed by André Forcier

See also
By the Light of the Silvery Moon (disambiguation)
Under the Moonlight (disambiguation)
Love by the Light of the Moon, 1901 film by Edwin S. Porter